Ghojalai is a village in Swat District of Khyber Pakhtunkhwa. Neighbouring settlements include Kabbal and Ghamjaba.

References

Populated places in Swat District